Senator Moulton may refer to:

George S. Moulton (1829–1882), Connecticut State Senate
Sherman R. Moulton (1876–1949), Vermont State Senate
William C. Moulton (1873–1927), Massachusetts State Senate